Maging Sino Ka Man (International title: More Than Love / ) is a 2006 Philippine melodrama romantic television series directed by FM Reyes Romilla Balmaceda and Mae Czarina Cruz-Alviar. The series stars John Lloyd Cruz, Bea Alonzo, Anne Curtis, and Sam Milby, with an ensemble cast consisting of Christopher de Leon, Chin Chin Gutierrez, Irma Adlawan, Bing Pimentel, Glenda Garcia, Dick Israel, and Smokey Manaloto in their supporting roles. The series premiered on ABS-CBN's Primetime Bida nighttime block, replacing Bituing Walang Ningning on its timeslot from October 9, 2006, to May 25, 2007, with a total of 163 episodes. It was replaced by Which Star Are You From.

A sequel to the series, Maging Sino Ka Man: Ang Pagbabalik, premiered on December 10, 2007, and ended on March 28, 2008.

Overview
The soap opera is noted to having two rather than one romantic team. It tackles intricate filial relationships among the elite and the poor and how the social economic classes respond to each other, longing for love and justice, Maging Sino Ka Man revolves around the lives of four main characters (Eli, Jackie, Celine, and JB) who each are searching for purpose, freedom, and happiness. The soap has been praised both by audiences and critics for its excellent storyline and powerhouse acting. It was tagged as phenomenal and was widely talked about online.
Recurring subplots include a father's masochistic attitude as a result of his hatred toward his deceased mother, an unfaithful wife who redeems herself as a mother, a business tycoon who gives heavy importance to power and creating the "perfect son," a son's submission to his overpowering mother, a young woman's struggles to move beyond her pain, a brother's guilt over a crime and a man's vengeful transformation due to the death of his foster father.
Asecond book of Maging Sino Ka Man has been announced to be aired after the first season, which features a further plot concerning other lives who have left mysteries and questions in Book 1.

Cast and characters

Main cast

Secondary cast 

Eli's adoptive mother, Eloisa (Marissa Delgado) only appeared in flashbacks and dream sequences.
While most of the characters were named after known politicians, the soap was also directly affected by the 2007 National and Local Elections. Christopher de Leon's character (Fidel Madrigal) was sent to the United States because the actor was running for vice-governor of the province of Batangas. The Commission on Elections Omnibus Code states a maximum for airtime minutes of candidates to ensure fair exposure of electoral bets.

Plot

Part 1: Bucolic Place
The first six weeks of the series spans a period of roughly three months.
Jackie has lost her memory and can only rely on Eli, whom she only knows as her husband, and whom she grows to eventually love. Eli is constantly plagued by the lies he has told Jackie. They lead a quiet and simple life, hidden away in a small provincial town, with many nosy but caring neighbors to help them adjust to their new life.
While in the province, Eli gets a job working at a quarry, where he meets the foreman, a man named Oca. Mang Oca recognizes the jade pendant that Eli wears around his neck and takes an immediate interest in Eli, but does not reveal the reason why. 
With Jackie now believed to be dead, the Madrigal, Berenguer, and Magsaysay families mourn their loss. Celine, who for many years has concealed a secret love for JB, spends time with him and in the process the two eventually develop a budding romance. Their relationship is complicated by the arrival of Kevin Romero (Baron Geisler), a client who makes no secret of his interest in Celine. With JB's support, Celine stands up to Kevin's blackmail attempt and gains confidence in herself. But before Celine and JB's relationship can grow further, Jackie hits her head in a fall and wakes up remembering who she is.

Part 2: Jackie's Resurrection
Weeks 7 to 10 sudden return.
Eli resorts to stalking Jackie, only to realize in a chance encounter that she no longer remembers him or the three months they spent together. Eli eventually finds the strength to move on, and with Mang Oca's help, he returns to school to complete his engineering degree. 
JB finds himself torn between two loves, and does not know how to choose between Jackie and Celine. Celine is unable to deal with JB's indecision and finally realizes that she has once again lost JB to Jackie. Grieving with the loss of JB, Celine recklessly uses her charms to land a lucrative account for the company, but her actions are caught on security cameras. JB is hurt and rejects Celine completely, causing her to go on a self-destructive drinking and partying spree. 
Jackie returns to her old life bringing new preferences, new convictions, and new habits. The subtle changes at first puzzle but later infuriate JB and her father. But Jackie learns to stand up for herself. 
This part of the series also delves more into the lives of several secondary characters, particularly Jackie's estranged parents, Fidel (Christopher de Leon) and Monique (Bing Pimentel). Their troubled marital past is revealed in bits and pieces—in her loneliness, Monique had given into the temptation of an extra-marital affair because her husband was emotionally distant. When he learned of the affair, Fidel threw her out of his home and cut her off without a single cent. Monique has been living with a gay beautician friend since then. 
Also in this part of the series, Eli and JB meet for the first time when Eli comes to JB's rescue during a carnapping attempt on JB's car. In the scuffle, Eli is stabbed and JB rushes him to the hospital. Eli earns JB's respect by refusing to take money as a reward, and when the two men part ways, JB asks Eli not to hesitate to contact him if he should need anything.
All throughout, Mang Oca continues to keep in touch with Eli, and even steps in to help with Eli's tuition fees and his hospital bills after the stabbing incident.

Part 3: Six Months Later
Weeks 10 to 13 of the series is set six months after Part 2.
Celine's mother, Imelda (Irma Adlawan), finally steps in and drags her daughter to a rehabilitation center called The Haven. With time, Celine manages to complete the program and in the process meets Brian Antonio (Ryan Eigenmann), the Haven's founder, who falls in love with her even though Celine is still not completely over JB.
Fidel decides to take Jackie to the US for further check-ups ostensibly because he is disturbed by her memory loss.  When they return to Manila, Jackie is determined to start a business and eventually opens a landscaping and gardening firm called Jade Gardens. Her continued quest for independence and her insistence on seeing her mother confuse and infuriate JB, but he forces himself to adjust and accept because he is determined to make their relationship work.
At a wedding, JB and Celine cross paths for the first time since their bitter argument months earlier. Their passion for one another is still there, but they are forced by circumstances to keep their feelings buried.

Part 4: The Plot Thickens
Jackie's memory seems to be returning, as she has discovered the province where she and Eli stayed during her memory loss. However, recollections remain vague and she does not remember Eli's involvement. Meanwhile, she and Eli become closer, much to the dismay of her father. 
JB finally professes his undying love for Celine, but gives in to Corazon's emotional blackmail after her suicide attempt, and asks Jackie to marry him. A heartbroken Celine parties the nights away, until Brian comes for her.  
Jackie is dismayed when Eli decides to quit his job at Jade Gardens, out of fear that Jackie's memory will soon return. His impending departure spurs Jackie to confess her love for him. She later returns her engagement ring to JB. When JB rushes to Celine, however, he is too late; she has already married Brian.
Fidel begins a tentative reconciliation with his estranged wife, Monique, and eventually asks her to move back into the Madrigal mansion, much to Jackie's delight and Corazon's dismay. But their reconciliation is short-lived as Corazon sabotages their relationship with some well-placed photographs of Monique with another man. Fidel throws Monique out of the house.

Part 5: Payback Time
Eli and Jackie elope but Fidel and JB catch up and assault Eli before bringing Jackie back home. With Celine's help, Jackie finally escapes her father and fiancé. Fidel sends men to get information from Dadoods and Pong, who are beaten for staying silent.
Eli and Jackie are back in the barrio and wait for Oca as he promised to help them. Time passes by and Oca still has not shown up at the barrio to help them. Eli goes back to the city to find him. Pong decides to visit the barrio and wants to talk to Jackie. However, Jackie suspects that someone is following her at the river near the barrio. Jackie panics and rushes to get out of the river when she slips and falls unconscious, hitting her head. Pong rushes over to help her, but when Jackie regains consciousness, she finally remembers everything... and feels betrayed. She goes back to the house in the barrio and waits for Eli. She promises to keep Eli's secrets and protect Pong, but leaves him despite his pleas for her to stay. 
Jackie's driver finally awakens and tells Fidel that Jackie had been lost during a kidnapping attempt. Eli and JB get into a fight and Eli lands in jail. Pong turns to Celine for help, and she bails Eli out. Eli returns to the hospital to find that Dadoods has died of his injuries while he was in jail.
Imelda finds Jackie at Celine's home and calls Fidel.
Pong is arrested after one of the kidnapping accomplices turn him in. Eli is enraged and frustrated when he finds Pong badly beaten in jail. 
Eli pleads with Fidel for Pong's life but Fidel pushes him away and spits on him.
Mang Oca finally tells Eli about his lost past.
Finding Eli's jade pendant necklace in her backyard and realizing it was the one the Roxas Patriarch (Don Roxas, father of Dona Corazon and Mamu G) was wearing in the photo at the Roxas ancestral house, Celine went to Corazon. She finds a sense of triumph in seeing Corazon beg as to who is the owner of the necklace. The possibility that Corazon might be Eli's real mother, and that she (Corazon) is also cheap, a point Corazon never fails to emphasize to her (Celine) whenever they are together, was enough irony.
Corazon and Celine go to see Eli and tells him he might be a Roxas, but Eli laughs at her and reveals that he already knows before throwing them out of his home.
Corazon is in anguish as she remembers giving baby Eli to Fidel many years ago.

Part 6: The Lost Truth
Corazon takes a DNA test, and finds out that Eli is a Roxas. She then reveals to JB that Eli is his cousin. The scene changes: Eli walks into a room and bumps into Mamu G. Mamu G stares at Eli and sees the pendant. There is a long flashback, and Mamu G immediately recovers from extreme depression as her memory returns. She hugs Eli, overjoyed. 
Corazon then approaches Mamu G, who slaps her in the face. Corazon demands to know why, stating that she has taken care of Mamu G for a long time, and deserves thanks for her care and assistance. JB consoles Corazon, saying that Mamu G is still recovering, and that maybe they should have a check-up first to see if she has completely recovered.
Indeed, she has. Left without a doubt that Mamu G acted of her own accord, Corazon asks for her reasons. Mamu G angrily asks Corazon how she could kill, and is unwilling to listen when Corazon tries to explain, arguing that she only wanted the baby to be hidden away, not to be killed. Mamu G tells Corazon that the exact opposite was both what Eli had told her and what Fidel had ordered. 
Corazon visits Fidel, angry at his betrayal. She asks him how he could have done that when she had trusted him all those years. Now, because of him, even her relationship with her sister is destroyed. Fidel tells her it was Mamu G's fault, and that he was forced into it.
Eli is reunited with his mother, which only drives JB to jealousy. He insults Eli, saying money is all Eli wants from Mamu G. Angry at the jibe, Eli replies that JB does not know him well, and so has no right to tell him that. Eli joins the RSL with vengeance in mind, and asks for JB's position in the company. Corazon agrees, to her son's surprise, as she feels she has done a great sin to Mamu G and must somehow seek retribution.
Mamu G discovers what happens, and is the one to comfort JB. Later on, JB comes over to Mamu G's for dinner—with Jackie.  Faced with the uncomfortable prospect of eating at the same table with Eli, Jackie wants to leave straight away. JB, however, will not let her, and brags to Mamu G and Eli about their wedding over dinner, apparently to make Eli jealous.

Part 7: The New, Rich Eli
Eli is now rich and powerful. This is the part where his Dadoods is killed because of Fidel and JB, and the part here his brother is in jail, and his life was totally in hell when his relationship with Jackie was destroyed. His anger with Fidel and JB is growing. He wanted to take revenge, which leads him into making a still unknown plan. He then decides to leave RSL and take all his shares from the company. Corazon was infuriated and tells him that he can't do that or their business will collapse. Eli soon convinces her, and Corazon's company starts losing a lot of money. People are getting angry with Corazon and JB. Eli later on wanted to take out his money from Fidel's bank, but it appears that the bank did not have enough money to convert the cheque into cash. Eli gets angry. He complains to Fidel about his company, and even threatens Fidel that he will destroy his reputation. Fidel gets enraged.

Part 8: Redemption
Fidel is showing signs of pity towards Jackie. The other day, he overhears Jackie talking to Celine, saying how sometimes she doesn't want to open her eyes anymore. She also says that everyday her life is being manipulated that she feels she is already dead. Fidel sees that Jackie is depressed and sad, sometimes not even eating. He totally manipulated her life, and he realizes how he has been evil to her. One morning, Jackie wakes up and sees Fidel serve her some breakfast. She asks why, and he replies that it isn't bad to give her breakfast once in a while, because she has always done that for him, and she hasn't been eating very much for some time. Jackie quietly thanks him, and Fidel smiles.
Later on, Jackie sees Fidel really tired and stressed out with work. She gets a bit worried, and serves breakfast to Fidel the next morning. Surprised, he cries. "The best coffee...For the best dad," was the line Jackie used to say.  Fidel was overjoyed, saying he thought he will never hear that again. He says that he was sorry for all that he has done, and said it was unfair for him to throw Monique out of the house just like that. Jackie was so happy, and they both hug.

Part 9: The Big Twist
Oca is still manipulating the mind of Eli. With Eli's plans to bankrupt Fidel's company, Jackie was forced to meet Eli and ask him to stop, Eli said yes to her demands but in return Jackie would have to marry him. Jackie ran away from his house, crying, not before saying a big fat NO to him.
The next day was JB and Jackie's wedding. JB promises to himself to be a good husband to Jackie. The guests and the groom have arrived and are waiting for Jackie. Jackie steps inside her bridal car with a determined look on her face. The maids are riding in front of the bridal car when they notice Jackie's car swayed the other way. The maids call Fidel about what happened which prompted JB to get into his car and drive after them.  When he finally catches up to it, he finds the car was empty which drove him to have a fit.
Later on, it is shown that Eli and Jackie signing the marriage contract. They got married instead, but not out of love. Eli married Jackie for his final revenge on Fidel, while Jackie married Eli to save her father's company. Jackie refused to let Eli kiss her on their wedding day.
JB returned to his drinking ways and shot Eli on the shoulder after returning from the bar. Oca told JB that if Eli sues him, he will rot in jail. But Eli didn't file a case against JB.
Celine sees a scrapbook of her tangible memories of JB. She burned it.
Oca ordered the beating of Pong in prison. Pong later suffers a traumatic breakdown. Eli blames Don Fidel for this and refused to hear what he is saying.

Don Fidel meets with Oca at a foreclosed building, and they argue. Oca tells Fidel that it was him who ordered the beating of Pong. Oca shoots at Fidel's feet. Fidel walks backwards to avoid the bullets until he falls down the stairs. Don Fidel is later rushed to the hospital, and Jackie is seen crying. Doña Corazon (JB's mother) visits him and tells him that because of ill will he deserved everything that's happened. Monique later takes care of Fidel, who tells her he is sorry for everything. Mamu G told Eli to let Fidel go.

Part 10: An Unfortunate Accident
Eli and Jackie fight about what happened to Fidel. A few hours later, Jackie and Celine go out to eat. While there Oca calls Eli that he'll do something bad to Jackie and Celine. So Eli and Brian tries to save Jackie and Celine, they get picked up. Oca catches up with Eli and tries to ram their car. Soon Eli's car tips over 4 times and Brian, Celine, Jackie, and Eli are left bleeding. For a while, Celine and Brian wake up and talk about they love each other and will miss each other. Soon the ambulance comes and takes them to the hospital. Meanwhile, Oca committed suicide by drowning himself. 
They recovered from their accident and Celine wakes up and starts to ask about Brian. She learned that Brian's dead and that she's pregnant. She asks the doctor how it was possible that she did not lose the baby during the accident the answer was that Brian moved to the back seat to protect Celine.
On Brian's funeral, Jackie tries to talk to Celine, but is ignored.  Eli suffered 2 fractured legs from the accident
JB wants to have some time with Celine's daughter to try to get Celine.
Eli wants to separate with Jackie in which she doesn't want to happen.
About a week, Corazon confronts Celine and gets into a fight causing Celine to bleed. Celine is  taken to the hospital by Jackie and is given the news that she had a miscarriage. Imelda confronts JB about how Corazon caused Celine's miscarriage. Then, JB starts a fight with Corazon and tells her he hated her. Corazon tells JB that she was the one that had Eli almost killed as a baby and caused Gloria to become ill. JB left his mother soon afterwards.  
About a half a year later, it was Jackie's birthday, which Eli forgot.  While Jackie was riding home, she saw JB walking and greeted her "Happy Birthday."  Eli spied to see JB and Jackie talking.

Part 11: New Lives
JB left home to work as a miner. During his break, he heard something in the woods and saw a girl swimming while JB hides so that the mystery girl won't see him.
He then found a job as a singer in a beach bar owned by Amang, whose right hand was disfigured. Amang and JB developed a father-son relationship as JB shared his knowledge on taxes and business. JB, here, is a humbled man, often calling Mommy G and sending Celine letters while she still struggles to move on from Brian's death.

Eli, meanwhile, thought Tomas Arroyo was his long lost father but was mistaken. He stopped looking for his father, when he learned that it was hurting his mom. Mommy G revealed that she was not able to tell Eli's father that she was pregnant with him.

Celine had a hard time dealing with the loss of her husband which puts her in a fight against Jackie. Celine then realized her mistake and made amends with Jackie by bringing a bucket of ice cream. Celine, in an effort to move on, sold her house and left Marsha to the care of her mother-in-law.

Eli also learned that Jackie greatly misses her parents. After receiving a letter from Oca [written before he dies] it is revealed that Jackie & Eli's wedding was fake and he let go of her. Jackie left for US but still obviously in love with Eli.

Months after, Jackie's mom, Monique felt Jackie's emptiness. She let her daughter go back with Celine to take care of what was disturbing her. Upon arriving, Jackie and Celine learned that Eli went to a remote farm owned by them. There, they meet Eli again and renew their relationship, though still seemingly platonic.

Corazon suffered embarrassment as she could not pay her bills plus the fact that she could not get along well with her neighbors. She was rescued financially by Tomas Arroyo who's in love with her but appears to be excessively possessive of her.

Celine and JB were able to finally resolve their conflicts and found the strength to love each other again. Eli learns of the identity of his father, Samuel. He was denied recognition but still felt complete. Eli proposes marriage to Jackie and he was shot by his secret enemy, bringing his life on the line. Eli sought enlightenment in the spirit world, thanks to Dadoods and found a new energy to live again, after a long-fought battle against death.

Finale of Book 1: A Nail-Biting Ending
Corazon decides to drop by the hospital to pay Eli a visit, and Gloria notices her, happy that her sister shows a hint of concern for her beloved son. Corazon then haughtily says that she's at the hospital not because of concern, but to watch Eli slowly die. This infuriates Gloria, and without a moment's hesitation, she slaps her older sister on the face, enraged at the words Corazon said.
At home ill luck masquerading as infatuation welcomes Corazon, as Tomas greets her, asking for her whereabouts, and eventually tells her that he's been waiting for her the whole night. He then shows her around the house, and Corazon notices the flowers all over the place, with Tomas proudly saying that they're all from him. He then shows her an expensive-looking necklace, which he places around her neck choking her. He again is overcome by a sadistic fit of jealousy and beats Corazon up.
Meanwhile, Eli goes back to the fountain with Dadoods, and tells Dadoods that inexplicably, he's always taken to that certain place. Dadoods explains that it's the only place that listens to him, and Eli asks that if the place really listens to him, then why isn't he brought back to Jackie's arms, to end her suffering. Dadoods explains that he can end her suffering by letting go of his hold on Jackie! Eli says no, and Dadoods explains that he's slowly losing grip in this world, as he's unable to see Pong anymore. Dadoods then tells Eli how much he loves them.
Eli reminisces on his own life, and it seems as if he's saying goodbye to Jackie. At the fountain, he's engulfed by light, breathing a prayer to God, and plunges himself to the fountain. At the hospital, Jackie is faithfully keeping vigil over Eli, crying and hoping that the love of her life will miraculously be brought back to life. And it seems as if all hope is lost, as Eli loses his pulse. Jackie throws herself over Eli in tears, praying that Eli won't be taken away from her. She then feels Eli's heart beating, and he suddenly comes back to life, much to Jackie's joy.
On another part of the country, a seedy lady, together with a mysterious girl, meets up with Samuel, and gazes at the photo of Eli. Who is this person, and what role will she play in Eli's life? Soon, a wedding invitation reaches Tomas and Corazon, but Tomas prohibits Corazon from going, as she looks defeatedly at the invitation, all battered and bloodied at Tomas' own hand.
It's a joyous moment as Eli's family minus Corazon, as well as Jackie's mother, all gather for Eli and Jackie's wedding ceremony. Celine silently mouths "I love you," to JB, while Eli and Jackie exchange their wedding vows. Afterwards, a mysterious lady in black approaches the newlyweds, wishing them good luck. A confused Eli asks her who she is, but she only gives a cryptic reply: he'll meet her soon enough. 
Maging Sino Ka Man consists of four lives, four hearts and four people in search of happiness in a complicated world. Everyone is ready to gamble it all...but of course all for love.

Episode Guide

Book 2

Theme song
The series theme song is also entitled Maging Sino Ka Man, which is composed by Rey Valera. The song was previously recorded by both Sharon Cuneta and Rey Valera, while the TV series theme was performed by Erik Santos. The same song would later be used in Juan dela Cruz (2013), another ABS-CBN drama series; for the said series, Martin Nievera was selected to sing the theme song.

Awards and recognitions and in entertainment
In the 2007 USTv Students' Choice Awards on Television by the University of Santo Tomas, the phenomenal soap won as the Best Drama Series while John Lloyd Cruz and Bea Alonzo won the Best Actor and Best Actress awards, respectively. While in 
the 2007 PMPC Star Awards, the same soap won as the Best Primetime Drama Series while John Lloyd Cruz won the Best Drama Actor award. In the 2007 Anak TV Seal Awards, the series won as one of The Country's 10 Most Well-Liked TV Programs.

See also
List of dramas of ABS-CBN
List of shows previously aired by ABS-CBN
List of Maging Sino Ka Man episodes

References

External links
 Maging Sino Ka Man Video clips - Blog
 Maging Sino Ka Man Video Blog
 Vice Ganda Website
 Maging Sino Ka Man (film) at the Internet Movie Database
 

ABS-CBN drama series
2006 Philippine television series debuts
2007 Philippine television series endings
Television series by Star Creatives
Philippine melodrama television series
Philippine romance television series
Filipino-language television shows
Television shows set in the Philippines